A H M Touhidul Anowar Chowdhury, commonly known as T A Chowdhury, is a Bangladeshi gynaecologist and obstetrician. He was awarded Independence Day Award in medical science in 2017.

Early life and education 
Chowdhury was born in 1937. He passed MBBS from Dhaka Medical College in 1960. He achieved FRCS from Royal College of Surgeons of Edinburgh. He obtained MRCOG  from Royal College of Obstetricians and Gynecologists in 1965.

Career 
He was director of the then IPGMR. He also served as president of Bangladesh College of Physicians and Surgeons.

Awards and honors 
Chowdhury was awarded Independence Day Award in medicine in 2017.

References 

Living people
Bangladeshi obstetricians
Bangladeshi gynecologists
Place of birth missing (living people)
Recipients of the Independence Day Award
1937 births
People from Senbagh Upazila